The United States Soccer Federation's State Soccer Associations are the local governing bodies of soccer in the United States. State Soccer Associations exist to govern all aspects of soccer in the United States. They are responsible for administering club and player registration as well as promoting development amongst those bodies and referees .

Most of the State Soccer Associations align roughly along state boundaries, although some of the more populated states have multiple soccer associations broken by geography (i.e. California, New York, and Texas).
 
The state soccer associations often host their own statewide cups and premier leagues for amateur outfits, often as a mechanism of regional qualification for the U.S. Open Cup competition.

List of state soccer associations 

The following state associations are affiliated with the United States Soccer Federation as the state association.

See also 
United States Soccer Federation
Soccer in the United States
County Football Association, a similar concept in England

References 

State associations
United States